Massimo Rosi (11 February 1944 – 28 December 1995) was an Italian swimmer. He competed in two events at the 1960 Summer Olympics.

References

1944 births
1995 deaths
Italian male swimmers
Olympic swimmers of Italy
Swimmers at the 1960 Summer Olympics
Sportspeople from Pisa